Hü King Eng (Foochow Romanized: Hṳ̄ Gĭnghŏng) was a physician, and the second ethnic Chinese woman to attend university in the United States, after King You Mé. (Contrast:-Dr King You Me [Yamei] was adopted and brought up by an American missionary family).  Her medical career is well-documented, as she was treated as a celebrity by American media, due to the lack of even American women studying medicine at the time.

Early life
Hü was born to a Chinese Christian family in Fuzhou. Her father's family had been military bureaucrats and had practised Buddhism, but Hü's father converted to Christianity in the 1870s, later becoming a minister of the Methodist Episcopal Church. Hü's mother joined her husband in spreading the gospel and travelled with him to various impoverished areas near Fuzhou. Lady Hü was a friend of Sarah Moore, the wife of the missionary Nathan Sites, who recorded that she endured much persecution as the wife of a minister, but was instrumental in preaching to female visitors interested in Christianity. The family had several daughters, one of whom died only months before Hü was born in 1865.

In accordance with contemporary fashions, Hü's feet were bound to make them smaller. During the process, her father decided that foot binding was unnatural and removed the bandages. When he left on a trip, Lady Hü reapplied the bandages, but removed them once again when Hü's father returned. Later, Hü visited a relative, who bound her feet again, but Lady Hü made her take the bandages off when she returned home. Hü argued that she was ashamed of her large feet that everyone ridiculed, but Lady Hü responded, "tell them bound-footed girls never enter the emperor's palace."

Education

Hü attended the Fuzhou Boarding School for Girls, which was run under the auspices of Woman's Foreign Missionary Society of the Methodist Episcopal Church. After leaving school, she trained at the Foochow Woman's Hospital under the guidance of Sigourney Trask, who wrote to the Woman's Foreign Missionary Society describing Hü's skills and good character. She requested that Hü should go to the United States to train in medicine. In 1884, Hü travelled to New York City, then to Philadelphia. On arrival in the United States, Hü could not speak English and she spent the summer before college learning intensively with Sarah Moore. She then attended Ohio Wesleyan Female College from 1884–1888,  which by that time had been merged with Ohio Wesleyan University.

In 1888, Hü went to the Woman's Medical College of Philadelphia. After two years, Hü fell ill and took a break from study to visit her family in China, with a trip to Japan on the way there. By this time, her father was suffering from tuberculosis and Hü spent her time nursing him, overseeing the construction of a new family home and working in the local hospital. When the house was finished in 1892, she returned to Philadelphia to complete her training, graduating in May 1894. She then worked for a year in the Philadelphia Polyclinic.

Career
Hü returned to Fuzhou in 1895 and began work at the Foochow Hospital for Women and Children. After one year, the supervising doctor returned to the United States and Hü was put in charge of the entire hospital.

In 1899, she became resident physician at the Woolston Memorial Hospital. At first, many patients demanded to see a foreign doctor not a, "Chinese student," but by the summer the number of patients had increased and Hü had to open the dispensary on extra days. From 1899–1901, Hü trained two medical students, one of whom was her younger sister Hü Seuk Eng. The hospital struggled with the number of patients, to the extent that a house was built for Hü on a hill outside the hospital grounds to allow for more patient beds to be installed. The number of cases dealt with by the hospital increased from 1,837 in 1899 to 24,091 in 1910.

Although it has been reported that Hü acted as representative to the International Congress of Women 1899, London, the minutes of the meeting list the representative of China as Madame Shen.

In 1906, Hü opened the course taught at the Woolston Memorial Hospital to any female who could pass a certain exam. Of the four students that passed that year, three were not Christian. However, the hospital continued to run Christian services every morning. Some of the patients Hu treated converted to Christianity, but this was relatively small in relation to the total number of patients the hospital served.

In 1907, Hü fell seriously ill and was unable to run the hospital. Though some advised that the hospital should be closed, her younger sister took over the responsibilities of management. Seuk Eng recalled that many patients arrived expecting to be cured by merely touching Hü's clothing or looking at her and were disappointed to see, "the little Dr Hü." However, the hospital continued running and Hü returned to advise her sister when she had recovered.

Later life
When the Woolston Memorial Hospital was burned down by bandits in January 1927, Hü moved with her younger sister to Singapore. She suffered a stroke and died on 16 August 1929.

Awards
Honorary degree in Master of Science, Ohio Wesleyan University

Compositions
Hü is recorded as having been very popular with her teachers and classmates at college and some of her literary writings are preserved. She composed the poem below to thank her teacher for a gift.

Personal life
Hü adopted a son and a daughter from the local community when she was working at the Woolston Memorial Hospital. Her adopted daughter was her own brother's eldest daughter, who lived just next door to her in Foochow.

References

Notes

Works cited

Ohio Wesleyan University alumni
1865 births
1929 deaths
Chinese Christians
People from Fuzhou
Chinese women physicians
19th-century Chinese women
19th-century Chinese people
20th-century Chinese women
20th-century Chinese people
Chinese expatriates in the United States
Woman's Medical College of Pennsylvania alumni
Physicians from Fujian
Woman's Foreign Missionary Society of the Methodist Episcopal Church